Selworthy Beacon is a hill and Marilyn of Exmoor in Somerset, England. It lies within the boundaries of Exmoor National Park, to the north of the village of Selworthy and northwest of Minehead. A road leads to the top, where there is a National Trust plaque and a view of the south coast of Wales across the Bristol Channel. The South West Coast Path also climbs the hill and ends slightly shy of the summit.

Geography
Selworthy Beacon is one of three peaks in Somerset, the other two being Dunkery Beacon and Periton Hill. Behind the hill, there are precipitous cliffs. Selworthy Beacon is situated within the National Trust-owned Holnicote Estate. Nearby are the Macmillan Way, Coleridge Way, and a fourteenth-century tithe barn.

History

Near the summit are a series of cairns, thought to be the remains of round barrows, and the British Iron Age Bury Castle. The round cairns have been scheduled as an ancient monument. In the sixteenth century, Selworthy Beacon was (as its name implies) the site of a beacon to warn of impending invasions.

Wildlife

Typical coastal plants are present, such as Sea Campion and Thrift (Armeria maritima), as well as gorse and heather (Calluna vulgaris).

References

External links
360 degree video from Selworthy Beacon on the South West Coastal Path

Exmoor
Marilyns of England
Scheduled monuments in West Somerset